Kachowhallan is a village in Kulgam district, in the union territory of Jammu and Kashmir, India. The village has approximately 100 houses with a population of about 1000. A road from the village of Okey to Kachowhallan was built by Pradhan Mantri Gram Sadak Yojana. There is a public middle school in the village. The primary source of income is from Apple Business. There is also a grave of the saint Sayed Kawsar near the local graveyard.

References

Kulgam district
Villages in Kulgam district